Pocket Classics are a brand of half scale classic cars sold in the UK and Europe, founded in 2010.

Description
The cars are designed for children, but can be driven by adults as well. Petrol powered versions can top 45 mph, and electric versions 15 mph.
Each car is different, however they typically have features such as indicators, headlights and horns.

Models
Pocket Classics have had 2 generations of cars which are all tributes to classic cars, but not endorsed or associated with the manufacturers of the original cars or branded as such:

Generation 1: 5 models
Porsche 356, Mercedes 300SL, Jaguar E-type, Bugatti Type 35 and Willys Jeep

Generation 2: 3 models
Jaguar XK120, AC Cobra, Ferrari_250#250_GT_Spyder_California_SWB

Media coverage
Pocket Classics were first featured in the media in late 2010 by Bild.

The cars were also road tested by Pistonheads.

References

External links
 Official Site
 Brochure

Toy cars and trucks